Aadharsam is a 1982 Indian Malayalam film, directed by Joshiy and produced by M. D. George. The film stars Prem Nazir, Jayabharathi, Srividya and Menaka in the lead roles. The film has musical score by Shyam.

Cast

Prem Nazir as Raveendran
Jayabharathi as Sathi/Lakshmi
Srividya as Sulochana 
Menaka as Malathi 
Sumalatha as Radha
Sathaar as Rajan
M. G. Soman as Mohan
Cochin Haneefa as Babu
Balan K. Nair as Jagadish/James
Janardhanan as Varghese
Thodupuzha Radhakrishnan as Manager Alex
Prathapachandran as Police Commissioner 
Vanitha Krishnachandran as Simmy 
Sankaradi as Velu pilla 
Vanchiyoor Radha as Hostel Metron
Jayamalini as dancer 
P. R. Menon as Groom's relative

Soundtrack
The music was composed by Shyam and the lyrics were written by Bichu Thirumala.

References

External links
 

1982 films
1980s Malayalam-language films
Films directed by Joshiy